Gernot Eder (born 14 August 1965 in Räckelwitz) is a German former sport shooter who competed in the 1988 Summer Olympics and in the 1992 Summer Olympics.

References

1965 births
Living people
German male sport shooters
ISSF pistol shooters
Olympic shooters of East Germany
Olympic shooters of Germany
Shooters at the 1988 Summer Olympics
Shooters at the 1992 Summer Olympics
People from Bautzen (district)
Sportspeople from Saxony
20th-century German people